Sir George Baxandall Constantine (22 June 1902 – 8 September 1969) was an English and Pakistani jurist who served as the Chief Justice of Sindh High Court, and prior to that, Governor of Sindh for a brief tenure. In 1955, he was elevated as the justice of the Supreme Court of Pakistan in 1955 and served until 1960.

Considered original textualist in his jurisprudence, he gained public importance when he termed Sir Malik Ghulam's attempt to dissolve the Constituent Assembly illegal, ruling in favour of the Speaker of the National Assembly, Maulvi Tamizuddin to restore Prime Minister Nazimuddin's administration.

In his famous Irish accent, he went on to declare the assembly as sovereign but Chief Justice Munir overturned Constantine's decision in the historic Maulvi Tamizuddin case.

Biography
George Baxandall Constantine was born in Bradford, England, United Kingdom on 2 June 1902 into an Irish-English family. He was educated at the Bradford Grammar School and attended the Oxford University where he graduated with a LBB degree. He joined the Indian Civil Service in 1926, serving in the judicial services of the empire.

References

1902 births
1969 deaths
English people of Irish descent
People from Bedford
People educated at Bradford Grammar School
Alumni of Balliol College, Oxford
Indian Civil Service (British India) officers
Justices of the Supreme Court of Pakistan
Governors of Sindh
Chief Justices of the Sindh High Court
Pakistani people of Anglo-Irish descent
Pakistani people of English descent
Pakistani people of Irish descent
Pakistani judges
British people in colonial India
Knights Bachelor
Pakistani civil servants